Saloni Malhotra is the founder and CEO of DesiCrew, an IT-enabled service company that provides back-office and support services in rural areas of Tamil Nadu and Karnataka. Although establishing a BPO company is not a major task, she is widely acclaimed for her work of establishing these in rural parts of the states and employing inexperienced and untrained people from small villages.

Career 
Saloni did her engineering from University of Pune in state of Maharashtra. She started her career in an interactive media startup, Web Chutney based in Delhi. She somehow came into contact of Professor Jhunjhunwala of TeNet group, IIT Madras and came up with this idea.

Her company DesiCrew received wide acclamation for this innovative approach and has been quite applauded. DesiCrew has rural delivery centers in Tamil Nadu, Karnataka and Gujarat, and employs 900-odd people from these villages. She currently is on the Board of Directors of DesiCrew.

Awards 
 TiE Stree Shakthi Award in 2011
 Nominated : BusinessWeek's Asia's Youngest Entrepreneurs
 Nominated : MTV Youth Icon 2008
 Nominated : E&Y Entrepreneur of the Year 2008
 Facilitated in the presence of the President of India by the CII.
  ^

References 

Indian chief executives
Living people
21st-century Indian businesswomen
21st-century Indian businesspeople
Indian women chief executives
Indian women company founders
Indian women business executives
Punjabi people
Punjabi Hindus
Year of birth missing (living people)